Cristo may refer to:
 Christ

People
Cristo Foufas, British radio presenter
 Giovanni Di Cristo (born 1986), Italian judoka
 Julio Sánchez Cristo (born 1959), Colombian radio personality
 Inri Cristo, (born 1948), a Brazilian self-proclaimed Messiah

See also
 Christo (name) 
 Christo (1935–2020), artist who wrapped public places in fabric
 Crist (surname)
 Crista (disambiguation)
 Cristi
 Cristy
 El Cristo (disambiguation)
 Kristo (disambiguation)
 Monte Cristo (disambiguation)